The 1977 Macdonald Brier, the Canadian men's national curling championship was held from March 6 to 12, 1977 at the Olympic Velodrome in Montreal, Quebec. Total attendance for the week was 50,001. This was the first time since  in which the number of ends for a regulation game was changed as games were shortened from 12 to 10 ends.

Team Quebec, who was skipped by Jim Ursel captured the Brier tankard on home soil as they finished round robin with a 9–2 record. This was Quebec's first Brier title.

The Ursel rink would go onto represent Canada in the 1977 Air Canada Silver Broom, the men's world curling championship in Karlstad, Sweden where they would finish runner-up, losing in the final to host Sweden.

Teams
The teams were as follows:

Round Robin standings
Final Round Robin standings

Round Robin results
All draw times are listed in Eastern Time Zone (UTC-05:00).

Draw 1
Sunday, March 6, 2:00 pm

Draw 2
Sunday, March 6, 7:30 pm

Draw 3
Monday, March 7, 9:30 am

Draw 4
Monday, March 7, 2:00 pm

Draw 5
Monday, March 7, 7:30 pm

Draw 6
Tuesday, March 8, 9:30 am

Draw 7
Tuesday, March 8, 2:00 pm

Draw 8
Wednesday, March 9, 2:00 pm

Draw 9
Wednesday, March 9, 7:30 pm

Draw 10
Thursday, March 10, 2:00 pm

Draw 11
Thursday, March 10, 7:30 pm

Draw 12
Friday, March 11, 2:00 pm

Draw 13
Friday, March 11, 7:30 pm

Draw 14
Saturday, March 12, 1:30 pm

Awards

All-Star Team 
The media selected the following curlers as All-Stars.

Ross G.L. Harstone Award
The Ross Harstone Award was presented to the player chosen by their fellow peers as the curler who best represented Harstone's high ideals of good sportsmanship, observance of the rules, exemplary conduct and curling ability.

References

External links
1977 MacDonald Brier at Soudog's Curling History
Curling Canada Youtube video

Curling competitions in Montreal
Macdonald Brier, 1977
The Brier
1970s in Montreal
1977 in Quebec
March 1977 sports events in Canada